Michael Hoey may refer to:

 Michael Hoey (athlete) (born 1939), Irish Olympic athlete
 Michael Hoey (golfer) (born 1979), Northern Irish professional golfer
 Michael Hoey (linguist) (1948–2021), British linguist
 Michael A. Hoey (1934–2014), British author and film and television writer, director, and producer

See also
 Michaël Van Hoey (born 1982), Belgian football player